Yersinia artesiana are short Gram-negative rod bacteria in the Yersiniaceae family that have been isolated from human stool.

References

External links
LSPN lpsn.dsmz.de
Type strain of Yersinia artesiana at BacDive -  the Bacterial Diversity Metadatabase

artesiana
Bacteria described in 2020